The Battle of Wippedesfleot was a battle in 466 between the Anglo-Saxons (or Jutes), led by Hengest, and the Britons. It is described in the Anglo-Saxon Chronicle thus:
465: 
465: Here Hengest and Æsc fought together against Welsh (= Britons) near Wippedesfleot and there slew 12 Welsh leaders, and one of their thanes was slain, whose name was Wipped.
This battle is said to have resulted in much bloodshed and slaughter on both sides, to the extent that hostilities abated for a while thereafter. Some historians believe in a Saxon victory, but that is not what is mentioned in the text. The limited number of casualties is an indication that the battle was a small one. The number of warriors involved must not have reached 200 men.

Wippedesfleot is thought to be Ebbsfleet in Kent, near Ramsgate. Its location made the author of the Historia Brittonum think that all Saxons had now been driven out of Britain. Wippedes is possibly a corruption of Latin oppidis in reference to the creek's position by the twin forts of Rutupiæ and Rutupiæ alteræ (Regulbium). Ramsgate is the main place upon the former Island of Thanet, "which was given to the Saxons by Vortigern". It was the very place where, according to the Historia Brittonum, the Saxons first landed.

Gildas does not mention the battle.

References

466
460s conflicts
Battles involving the Britons
Battles involving the Anglo-Saxons
Battles involving Kent
5th century in England